Austin Gallagher is an American marine biologist, explorer, author and social entrepreneur, best known for his research on sharks. He is the founder and CEO of Beneath the Waves, a non-profit organization focusing on ocean conservation. He is a National Geographic Explorer, has been the lead on more than 50 global scientific expeditions, and has published over 100 scientific papers spanning research on the migrations of ocean giants, deep-sea exploration, and marine policy. 

His research has directly informed policy for threatened species, protected area design, and climate change mitigation in numerous countries. He was a Forbes 30 Under 30 honoree in the science category. He is a current fellow of the Explorers Club and a Fulbright scholar and distinguished professor.

Early life and education
After graduating from Thayer Academy near his home city of Boston in 2004, Gallagher moved to Baltimore to attend Loyola University Maryland where he majored in biology and minored in journalism, graduating in 2008. From 2008 to 2009, he obtained a master's in marine science from Northeastern University as part of the Three Seas Program.  In 2010, he began his doctoral degree in environmental science from the University of Miami, studying shark physiology and behavior, ultimately finishing in 2015.

Career
During his masters and doctoral research years, he founded Beneath the Waves, initially created as a platform for inspiring effective storytelling in the marine science community. From 2010-2013, Gallagher molded Beneath the Waves into an event series that brought together scientists, filmmakers, and the general public, licensing the brand and event series to over 40 institutes from 25 countries. In 2014, Gallagher incorporated Beneath the Waves as a non-profit organization in the United States, creating a more expansive mission that included research activities.

From 2015 – 2017, he worked as a postdoctoral research fellowship at Carleton University in Ottawa, Canada under the supervision of Dr. Steven Cooke. In 2018, he began working full time at Beneath the Waves as its Chief Scientist. In 2021, Gallagher assumed the role as CEO, focusing his efforts on setting the high-level scientific strategy and executing impactful partnerships.

Gallagher sits on the editorial board of the scientific journal Endangered Species Research.

He maintains formal adjunct professorship positions at The University of Exeter (UK) and Northeastern University. Through these universities, he has mentored over 20 graduate students, over 75% of them female.

Gallagher is a frequent host, wildlife presenter, and talent for Discovery Channel and Shark Week, and he has also appeared on Nat Geo Wild.

Scientific Impact 
Gallagher is a broadly-trained biologist focusing on studying survival in marine animals. He is a world authority on sharks, conducting research aimed at advancing our understanding of their behavior and physiology, and using this information to create protected areas. To date he has published over 100 peer-reviewed scientific articles, and he has presented his work at numerous institutions including the Massachusetts Institute of Technology and National Geographic. He has been credited as being one of the first scientists to demonstrate that sharks were worth more alive for tourism than dead for fishing, and has emerged at the forefront of various branches of marine science, most notably shark research.

In 2015 he led the first ever multi-national expedition to study sharks in Japan, which was featured as the cover story of the February 2016 issue of Outside Magazine and covered by GoPro.

In 2016, he spearheaded a shark and fishing boat tracking initiative Global Fishing Watch, in partnership with Oceana, Google, and SkyTruth.

In 2017, he led the science on the BVI Art Reef, a collaborative project with Sir Richard Branson that sunk a derelict WWII ship for the purposes of establishing an artificial reef to restore overfished species in the British Virgin Islands.  

In 2018 he began investing heavily in The Bahamas as a research locality, with a project evaluating the benefits of large protected areas for sharks.  producing the first publication on the long-term movements of sharks within a shark sanctuary, the first records of harmful metal concentrations in sharks from the region, the first application of 360-degree camera technology to marine species, and the first description of the genome of the Caribbean reef shark. The Bahamas work lead by Beneath the Waves has generated significant press and has been featured in Forbes, Scientific American, and on Sir Richard Branson's Virgin blog.

From 2019 - 2020, Gallagher began significantly expanding his research footprint throughout the Atlantic Ocean and Caribbean, and began producing several “first-ever” discoveries for the study of the ocean, including the description of likely-new species of bonnethead shark off Panama, the first global assessment of shark and fishing vessel movements, the first video recordings and imagery of the sharpnose sevengill shark (at 2200 feet deep), the first published science on the potential ecological effects of white sharks in the Atlantic, and the first record of sawfish in Biscayne Bay, Miami, Florida.

In 2020, Gallagher began working closely with Dr. Carlos Duarte, recognized as one of the world’s top marine scientists and most-influential scientists (of all disciplines), whom inspired Gallagher’s research expansion into blue carbon. Through a unique partnership with tagged tiger sharks, Gallagher and Duarte discovered the world’s largest seagrass meadow in The Bahamas, estimated to be up to 93,000 square kilometers.

In 2021, Gallagher led the first expedition to study deep-sea fish fauna off Turks and Caicos. From 2021, Gallagher served as the co-Principal Investigator on two multi-year Darwin Plus projects, funded by the government of the United Kingdom, to study the deep-water biodiversity of Bermuda and The Cayman Islands.

Entrepreneurship 
Gallagher has helped activate Beneath the Waves into a variety of influential communities and pop-culture events, including Summit Series, the 1 Hotel, Tortuga Music Festival, and Bonnaroo Music and Arts Festival. He has worked with the Grand Isle Resort and Spa in Great Exuma, Bahamas, to expose visitors of the resort to hands-on shark tagging research, thus creating a sustainable business model for funding ocean research. In 2017 he co-founded a beverage startup called Tempo, which produces plant-based, functional, and clean beverages for the modern consumer, whose products are currently sold in Whole Foods Market in the midwestern United States.

Notable Accomplishments
In 2016, Gallagher became the first American marine biologist to make the Forbes 30 Under 30 List, at the age of 29. He was also the only conservation biologist on the list in 2016. From 2016-2017 he served as a member of the Forbes Non Profit Council. In April 2016 he was awarded the Loyola University Young Alumni Award, and in the same month he gave a TEDx talk in San Diego, California, on facing your fears to change the world.

In 2019, Gallagher became a Fulbright distinguished professor.

In 2021, Gallagher was awarded Scuba Diving Magazine’s Sea Hero Award.

References

External links

 

Living people
American conservationists
American marine biologists
Year of birth missing (living people)